The Catholic Church of Ma'alul is a Catholic Church in the village of Ma'alul in northern Israel.

History
The church was restored in 2011 and together with a Greek Orthodox Church and a mosque part of what remains of the ancient Arab village of Ma'alul, just a few kilometers west of Nazareth and which was formed mainly by Christian Palestinians until 1948 when it was destroyed during the 1947–1949 Palestine war.

The church is managed by descendants of the original inhabitants.

See also
Roman Catholicism in Israel
Latin Patriarchate of Jerusalem
Christianity in Israel

References

Roman Catholic churches in Israel